The Best of Steely Dan: Then and Now is a compilation album by Steely Dan, released in 1993. The album cover is a photograph of Carhenge in Nebraska.

Track listing
All songs written by Walter Becker and Donald Fagen.

"Reelin' in the Years" (from Can't Buy a Thrill, 1972) – 4:37
"Rikki Don't Lose That Number" (from Pretzel Logic, 1974) – 4:32
"Peg" (from Aja, 1977) – 3:56
"FM (No Static at All)" (non-album single from the FM soundtrack, 1978) – 5:05
"Hey Nineteen" (from Gaucho, 1980) – 5:04
"Deacon Blues" (from Aja, 1977)  – 7:31
"Black Friday" (from Katy Lied, 1975)  – 3:39
"Bodhisattva" (from Countdown to Ecstasy, 1973) – 5:17
"Do It Again" (from Can't Buy a Thrill, 1972) – 5:56
"Haitian Divorce" (from The Royal Scam, 1976) – 5:50
"My Old School" (from Countdown to Ecstasy, 1973)  – 5:46
"Midnite Cruiser" (from Can't Buy a Thrill, 1972) – 4:07
"Babylon Sisters" (from Gaucho, 1980) – 5:50
"Kid Charlemagne" (from The Royal Scam, 1976) – 4:38
"Dirty Work" (from Can't Buy a Thrill, 1972) – 3:08
"Josie" (from Aja, 1977) – 4:30

Charts

Certifications

References

1993 greatest hits albums
Steely Dan compilation albums